Christmas is the seventh studio album and first Christmas album released by Canadian singer Michael Bublé. The album was released on October 21, 2011, in Ireland, on October 24, 2011, in the United Kingdom, and on October 25, 2011, in the United States. On the week ending December 10, 2011, Christmas rose to No. 1 on the Billboard 200 album sales chart, becoming Bublé's third chart-topper following 2007's Call Me Irresponsible and 2009's Crazy Love, and spent five weeks at No. 1.

As of December 2021 this is Buble's most successful album with more than 12 million copies worldwide, making it one of the best-selling albums of the 21st century and one of the best-selling Christmas albums worldwide.

The album also won a Juno Award for Album of the Year, making it the first holiday album to win the award. The album was re-released on November 26, 2012, containing four additional tracks, including a new recording of "The Christmas Song". Bublé also released a reworked version of "White Christmas", this time featuring Shania Twain, as a single. This version premiered on Bublé's NBC television special, Home for the Holidays, on December 10, 2012.

Background
The album is Bublé's second Christmas-themed release after he released a five-track extended play, titled Let It Snow in 2003. Some of the songs from Let It Snow have been re-recorded for inclusion on Christmas, making Christmas his first full-length holiday release. For the album, Bublé teamed up with several well-known artists to record duets. His duet version of "White Christmas" with country music singer Shania Twain was based on an early arrangement by The Drifters, while his recording of "Jingle Bells" with the Puppini Sisters was based on the 1943 recording of Bing Crosby and the Andrews Sisters. He also teamed up with Latin star Thalía for a recording of "Feliz Navidad". Bublé also recorded covers of Mariah Carey's "All I Want for Christmas Is You", and "Blue Christmas", and a brand new track, "Cold December Night", written with his longtime co-writer Alan Chang and producer Bob Rock.

Promotion
The album's track listing was unveiled by Bublé on September 27, 2011. Bublé filmed several music videos in order to promote the album, including videos for the tracks "Santa Claus Is Coming to Town", the lead single "All I Want for Christmas Is You", "Holly Jolly Christmas", "Christmas (Baby Please Come Home)", "Have Yourself a Merry Little Christmas", and "Jingle Bells". Bublé also appeared to perform during the final of the eighth series of The X Factor in the United Kingdom on December 11, 2011. Bublé's recording of "All I Want for Christmas Is You" was also featured in a montage on ABC-TV's General Hospital that aired on December 23, 2011.

Specials
On December 6, 2011, Bublé promoted the album in the United States with the broadcast of an NBC television special, A Michael Bublé Christmas, a show produced by Ben Silverman. The special was viewed by more than 7.07 million viewers, receiving a 1.5 rating and 4% share among adults between the ages of 18 and 49. In Canada, the special was viewed by 1.533 million viewers, ranking the seventeenth most watched programme overall for the week. Zap2it reviewed the special, and claimed it to be "one of the year's television guilty pleasures". On December 18, 2011, Bublé promoted the album in the United Kingdom with the broadcast of an ITV1 television special, Michael Bublé: Home for Christmas. The special featured guest appearances from comedian Dawn French, duet performances with both Kelly Rowland and Gary Barlow, and a cooking tutorial with Gino D'Acampo. The special pulled in 5.7 million viewers, and was the third most-watched ITV Christmas special of the season.

Michael later announced that he was to film another NBC special, titled Michael Bublé: Home for the Holidays, featuring guest appearances from Rod Stewart, Blake Shelton, and Carly Rae Jepsen. The special aired on December 10, 2012; and was watched by 5.66 million American viewers, receiving a 1.4/4 18-49 rating/share.

On October 18, 2013, it was announced that Michael will feature in a third Christmas special on December 18, 2013, via NBC. Guest stars featuring in the special include Mariah Carey, Mary J. Blige, and Cookie Monster.

Commercial performance

On November 5, 2011, Christmas debuted at No. 3 on the Billboard 200 charts in the United States, with first-week sales of 141,000 copies, according to Nielsen SoundScan. In its fifth week on the chart, the album climbed to No. 1, and held the top spot for the following four weeks, becoming Bublé's biggest selling chart-topper yet by beating the two-week reign of his previous album, Crazy Love. Christmas also sold 479,000 copies in the album's third week at No. 1, which marked Bublé's best sales week ever. On the album's tenth week on the album charts, and with Christmas having passed, the album fell to No. 24 on January 14, 2012. As of January 2017 it shares the sixth-largest drop from #1 with Blue Slide Park by Mac Miller.

For the year, Christmas sold 2,452,000 copies in the United States, according to SoundScan, and was the second best-selling album of the year, just behind Adele's blockbuster album 21.  In 2012, Christmas sold an additional 622,000 copies in the U.S. according to SoundScan, and was the second best-selling holiday album of the year (behind Rod Stewart's Merry Christmas, Baby). By December 4, 2017, the album has sold 4,129,000 copies in the United States, making it his best selling album in the country. And as of December 2022, the album has sold 4,500,000 copies in United States.

In Canada, the album debuted at No. 2 on the Canadian Albums Chart, selling 37,000 copies in its first week. In its third week of release, the album climbed to No. 1, selling an additional 32,000 copies. As of December 14, 2011, the album has sold 444,000 copies in Canada.

Christmas also debuted at number 2 in Australia on October 31, 2011. The album has since been certified double Diamond by the Australian Recording Industry Association (ARIA) for shipments of over 910,000 copies. It hit number 1 in December 2011, 2012, 2013 and 2014. It reached number 2 in 2015, being held off from the top spot by Adele's 25. In 2016, the album peaked at number 2 in December, then hit number 1 for the fifth time in the week of January 2, 2017. During the Christmas season of 2017, it peaked at number 4 in early December. In December 2019, it hit number 1 in Australia for the sixth time, becoming the first album to top the ARIA albums chart at six separate times in different years.

Despite competition from Snow Patrol's album Fallen Empires, Christmas peaked at No. 1 on the UK Albums Chart. It sold 1,292,000 copies in the UK in 2011, making it the second best-selling album of 2011. It is the first seasonal album to chart within the top 10 three years in a row, as it charted at number one in 2011, at number two in 2012, and at number seven in 2013. As of December 2021, the album is the best-selling holiday album in the UK, selling over 3 million copies. The album returned to No. 1 for a fourth non-consecutive week on 1 January 2021, nine years after its initial three week run at the top in 2011 and became the first album to disappear from the No. 1 spot on the UK albums chart on 8 January 2021 (previously The Vamps had achieved the record for biggest drop from number one, when their album fell from the top to No.72 in November 2020).

Track listing
Information is based on the album's Liner Notes

Notes
Tracks 3, 10 and 14 are credited to Traditional.
The Subliminal 9 are Caco Cocci, Steve Hartley, Paul Kirzner, Carsten Love, Lanny McVeigh, Derek Nyrose, Brad Openshaw, Ron Toigo and Rob Ubles.

Personnel
Information is based on the album's liner notes

 Michael Bublé – vocals (1-2, 5–8, 11–13, lead on 3–4, 9–10, 14–15), musical arrangement (4)
 Janet Adderley – children's choir director (10)
 Rusty Anderson – additional guitar (12)
 Christopher Bazzoli – string section conductor, horn section conductor (5)
 Chuck Berghofer – bass guitar (1-4, 6, 13)
 Jon Brion – string arrangement, horn arrangement (5)
 Alan Broadbent – orchestral arrangement (1, 13)
 Bob Buckley – orchestra conductor (8)
 Paul Bushnell – bass guitar (9, 11–12)
 Clayton Cameron – drums (8)
 Alan Chang – piano (5, 7, 9, 11–12, 15), musical arrangement, celesta (8, 12), glockenspiel, string arrangements (12)
 Judy Chilnick – percussion (7)
 Vinnie Colaiuta – drums (3, 15)
 Brad Dechter – musical arrangement, orchestra conductor (7), orchestration (14), string arrangement (15)
 Graham Dechter – guitar (1-4, 6–8, 13)
 Nathan East – bass guitar (15)
 Peter Erskine – drums (1, 13)
 Nicholas Essig – assistant recording engineer (5, 8–9, 11–12)
 Alan Estes – percussion (9, 11, 15)
 Greg Fields – drums (2, 4, 6)
 David Foster – orchestral arrangement (1, 13), musical arrangement (1, 3–4, 6, 10, 13–14), keyboards (1-4, 6, 10, 13–14)
 Josh Freese – drums (9, 12)
 Humberto Gatica – rhythm arrangement, vocal arrangement (15), recording engineer, audio mixing (7, 15)
 Steve Genewick – assistant recording engineer (1-6, 8–14)
 Eric Helmkamp – recording engineer (5, 8–9, 11–12), audio mixing (11)
 Wataru Hokoyama – string section conductor, horn section conductor (12)
 Kevin Kanner – drums (7)
 Jim Keltner – drums (5, 11)
 Gayle Levant – harp (10, 14)
 Chris Lord-Alge – audio mixing (5, 9, 12)
 Eric Mosher – assistant recording engineer (5, 8–9, 11–12)
 Kenny O'Brien – harmony arrangement (15)
 Dean Parks – guitar (7, 15, acoustic on 10)
 Alan Pasqua – piano (1-4, 6–7, 13)
 Dave Pierce – musical arrangement (9, 11), orchestra conductor (9, 11–12), string arrangement, horn arrangement (12)
 Craig Polasko – bass guitar (5, 8, 11), musical arrangement, synth strings, additional drums (5) 
 The Puppini Sisters – background vocals (3)
 Cristian Robles – recording engineer (7, 15)
 Bob Rock – audio mixing (11)
 Bill Ross – orchestration (10)
 Jochem van der Saag – synthesizer, synthesizer programming, recording engineer, audio mixing (1-4, 6, 10, 13–14)
 Al Schmitt – recording engineer (1-4, 6, 10, 13–14), audio mixing (8)
 Keith Scott – guitar (5, 9, 11–12)
 Don Sebesky – orchestration (4)
 Paul Smith – assistant recording engineer (7, 15)
 Sally Stevens – choir director (14)
 The Subliminal 9 – additional background vocals (9)
 Thalía – lead vocals (15)
 Shania Twain – lead vocals (4)
 Michael Valerio – bass guitar (7)
 Jorge Vivo – recording engineer (1-4, 6, 10, 13–14)
 Chris Walden – orchestration (3)
 Brian Warwick – additional recording engineer (12)
 Pat Williams – musical arrangement (2)
 Lyle Workman – guitar (5, 9, 11–12)

Charts

Weekly charts

Year-end charts

Decade-end charts

All-time charts

Certifications and sales

See also 
List of best-selling albums in Australia
List of diamond-certified albums in Canada
List of best-selling albums of the 21st century
List of best-selling albums in the United States of the Nielsen SoundScan era

References

143 Records albums
2011 Christmas albums
Albums produced by Bob Rock
Albums produced by David Foster
Albums recorded at Capitol Studios
Albums recorded at The Warehouse Studio
Christmas albums by Canadian artists
Juno Award for Album of the Year albums
Michael Bublé albums
Reprise Records albums
Swing Christmas albums